Barratt may refer to:

People
Barratt (surname)

Brands and companies
Barratt (confectionery), a brand owned by Monkhill Confectionery
 Barratt Developments, a house builder
 Barratts Shoes, a brand of shoe stores in the UK and Ireland

Music
Barratt (album), the only solo album released by Norman Barratt

See also
 Barrett (disambiguation)